The  is the largest resort in Hokkaidō, Japan, operated by Kamori Kankō. The resort is famous for its ski slopes but also offers year-round attractions including an amusement park and golf courses.

Ski resort
The ski resort extends over three mountains; West Mountain, East Mountain, and Mount Isola. Rusutsu Resort was the first Japanese ski resort to be awarded Best Small Resort by The Great Skiing & Snowboarding Guide, a British ski magazine. According to a 2003 survey by View Communications, Japanese NPO, skiers ranked the resort as the most satisfying among 48 ski resorts in Japan.

Courses
All slopes allow skiing, snowboarding, and snowscooting.
Slopes for beginners: 10
Slopes for intermediate skiers: 12
Slopes for advanced skiers: 11
Slopes for very advanced skiers: 4
Total: 37

Aerial lifts

Amusement park
The amusement park offers more than 60 attractions and rides including eight roller coasters, swimming pools, ropes courses, train rides, go karts and other thrill rides.

The operator increased the number of rides by buying discounted facilities from closing amusement parks and local exposition from other parts of Japan and overseas. The outdoor swimming attractions are open in summer vacation season, can be open as short as four weeks from the end of July.
Roller coasters

Golf courses
There are four golf courses; Tower Course, Izumikawa Course, River Course, and Wood Course, with 72 holes in total.

Hotels
There are six hotels; South Wing, North Wing, and The Westin Rusutsu Resort (previously Rusutsu Tower),The Vale Rusutsu (Condo Hotel),Travel Lodge, Highland Lodge(previously Main Building) . The facilities can accommodate up to 4,000 visitors. Since July 8, 2016, it has been renamed to The Westin Rusutsu Resort. It is linked to South Wing by a slope car (small rack monorail), and to East Mountain by Tower Pair Lift.

There also is a campsite. Renewaled at 2021, expanded shop service and opened RV grounds.

See also
List of ski areas and resorts in Asia
List of amusement parks
List of aerial lifts in Japan

External links
 Rusutsu Resort official website
 Rusutsu Resort official website
 Rusutsu Resort official website
 Rusutsu Resort official website
 Kamori Kankō official website

Ski areas and resorts in Hokkaido
Amusement parks in Japan
Gondola lifts in Japan
Buildings and structures in Hokkaido
Tourist attractions in Hokkaido